Behind the Walls (original title: Les Hauts Murs) is a 2008 French drama film directed by Christian Faure and based on an autobiographical work, Les Hauts Murs ('The High Walls'), by Auguste Le Breton.

Plot 
The title refers to an approved school to which Yves Tréguier is consigned in the 1930s, he being a 14-year-old ward of the nation. There he finds friendship and learns the nature of rebellion and violence. He hopes to make his way one day to New York City in the United States.

Cast 
 Carole Bouquet as The wire's mother
 François Damiens as The chief officer
  as Yves Tréguier
 Pascal N'Zonzi as Oudie
 Catherine Jacob as The director
 Michel Jonasz as The supervisor 
 Bernard Blancan as Yves's stepfather
 Guillaume Gouix as Blondeau
 Anthony Decadi as Molina
 Finnegan Oldfield as The beggar
  as The wire
  as The rat

References

External links 

2008 films
2008 drama films
Films based on works by Auguste Le Breton
Films set in the 1930s
French drama films
2000s French films